The 1984 World Rally Championship was the 12th season of the Fédération Internationale de l'Automobile (FIA) World Rally Championship (WRC). The season consisted of 12 rallies following the same schedule as the previous season. Stig Blomqvist beat the defending world champion and Audi teammate Hannu Mikkola to the drivers' title. Audi took their second manufacturers' title, ahead of Lancia and the debuting Peugeot.

Summary

German team Audi Sport put together four of the top drivers in the world, with the defending world champion Hannu Mikkola returning to the team along with Stig Blomqvist. Michèle Mouton had a part-time contract and two-time champion Walter Röhrl was added from Martini Racing. Lancia Martini kept Markku Alén as their primary driver for the season and also featured Miki Biasion and Attilio Bettega. Lancia boss Cesare Fiorio had also signed Henri Toivonen from Porsche, stating that "Audi will have four top drivers next year so it would be very difficult competing with only two."

Blomqvist and Mikkola dominated the season in the Audi Quattro A2, with Blomqvist proving the best with five rally wins. Audi established an early lead, winning six of the first eight events, including sweeping the podium at the first two rallies. Mikkola had to settle for second overall despite a consistently strong season in which he took eight podium finishes. Alén was only able to reach third place, only capturing a single rally win in his Lancia Rally 037.

Late in the season, Ari Vatanen returned to the world rally scene in a Peugeot 205 T16, winning three of the final four rallies and reaching fourth place in the overall standings. His performance showed that Peugeot Sport, headed by Jean Todt, had a winner that could beat the Audi, which they would do in the coming years of Group B dominance.

As with previous seasons, while all twelve events were calculated for tallying the drivers' scores, only ten of the events applied to the championship for manufacturers. The two events in 1984 which applied only to driver standings were the Swedish Rally and the Rallye Côte d'Ivoire.

Teams and drivers

Events

Map

Schedule and results

Standings

Drivers' championship

Manufacturers' championship

Pointscoring systems

Drivers' championship

Manufacturers' championship

References

External links 

 FIA World Rally Championship 1984 at ewrc-results.com

World Rally Championship
World Rally Championship seasons